Pocket billiards is another name for the cue sport of pool.  It may also refer to:

"Pocket Billiards (band)", a nine-piece ska/punk band from Belfast, Northern Ireland
"Pocket Billiards", a song by British folk-rock group Stackridge from the 1974 album Extravaganza
"Pocket billiards" (UK) or "pocket pool" (US), slang for masturbation through one's trouser pocket